The Old Man and the Medal is a 1956 post colonial novel by Cameroonian diplomat and writer Ferdinand Oyono. The novel was translated by John Reed into English in 1967 and republished in 1969 in the influential Heinemann African Writers Series.

When reflecting on the novel, in Oyono's obituary, The Guardian writer Shola Adenekan described the novel as "evoking the deep sense of disillusionment felt by those Africans who were committed to the west, yet rejected by their colonial masters."

References 

1956 Cameroonian novels
African Writers Series
French-language novels